Plano is an unincorporated community in Fayette and Ross counties, in the U.S. state of Ohio.

History
An early variant name was Dogtown. A post office was established at Plano on the Ross County side in 1892, where it remained in operation until 1903.

References

Unincorporated communities in Fayette County, Ohio
Unincorporated communities in Ross County, Ohio
Unincorporated communities in Ohio